Zietenplatz is a square in Berlin, Germany. It is named after Hans Joachim von Zieten.

External links
 

Squares in Berlin
Mitte